Jegunovce is one of the larger villages in the Polog Valley, North Macedonia. It is located about 10 mi (15 km) northeast of the Macedonian city of Tetovo. It is the center of the Jegunovce Municipality.

History 
Jegunovce began to grow from a village into a small town after World War II, when the new Yugoslav government under Josip Broz Tito built a massive metallurgical plant (working mostly with chromium) in the area. The plant was named Jugohrom, and was one of the largest employers in Yugoslavia. The plant was renamed Silmak in 2002, and closed in 2006. After reopening and closing later on again in early 2009 due to the world financial crisis and rapid decline in demand, Silmak started its operations again in July, 2009.

Demographics
According to the 2002 census, the village had a total of 846 inhabitants. Ethnic groups in the village include:

Macedonians 804
Serbs 13
Romani 21
Others 8

Sports
The local football club is FK Jugohrom.

See also 
 Jegunovce municipality
 North Macedonia
 Municipalities of North Macedonia

References

External links 
 Official site of Jegunovce municipality

Villages in Jegunovce Municipality